Lecithin (from the Greek lekithos "yolk") is a generic term to designate any group of yellow-brownish fatty substances occurring in animal and plant tissues which are amphiphilic – they attract both water and fatty substances (and so are both hydrophilic and lipophilic), and are used for smoothing food textures, emulsifying, homogenizing liquid mixtures, and repelling sticking materials.

Lecithins are mixtures of glycerophospholipids including phosphatidylcholine, phosphatidylethanolamine, phosphatidylinositol, phosphatidylserine, and phosphatidic acid.

Lecithin was first isolated in 1845 by the French chemist and pharmacist Théodore Gobley. In 1850, he named the phosphatidylcholine lécithine. Gobley originally isolated lecithin from egg yolk – λέκιθος (lekithos) is "egg yolk" in Ancient Greek – and established the complete chemical formula of phosphatidylcholine in 1874; in between, he demonstrated the presence of lecithin in a variety of biological materials, including venous blood, human lungs, bile, roe, and brains of humans, sheep and chicken.

Lecithin can easily be extracted chemically using solvents such as hexane, ethanol, acetone, petroleum ether or benzene; or extraction can be done mechanically. Common sources include egg yolk, marine foods, soybeans, milk, rapeseed, cottonseed, and sunflower oil. It has low solubility in water, but is an excellent emulsifier. In aqueous solution, its phospholipids can form either liposomes, bilayer sheets, micelles, or lamellar structures, depending on hydration and temperature. This results in a type of surfactant that usually is classified as amphipathic. Lecithin is sold as a food additive and dietary supplement. In cooking, it is sometimes used as an emulsifier and to prevent sticking, for example in non-stick cooking spray.

Production
Commercial lecithin, as used by food manufacturers, is a mixture of phospholipids in oil. The lecithin can be obtained by water degumming the extracted oil of seeds. It is a mixture of various phospholipids, and the composition depends on the origin of the lecithin. A major source of lecithin is soybean oil. Because of the EU requirement to declare additions of allergens in foods, in addition to regulations regarding genetically modified crops, a gradual shift to other sources of lecithin (such as sunflower lecithin) is taking place. The main phospholipids in lecithin from soy and sunflower are phosphatidylcholine, phosphatidylinositol, phosphatidylethanolamine, phosphatidylserine, and phosphatidic acid. They are often abbreviated to PC, PI, PE, PS and PA, respectively. Purified phospholipids are produced by companies commercially.

Hydrolysed lecithin
To modify the performance of lecithin to make it suitable for the product to which it is added, it may be hydrolysed enzymatically. In hydrolysed lecithins, a portion of the phospholipids have one fatty acid removed by phospholipase. Such phospholipids are called lysophospholipids. The most commonly used phospholipase is phospholipase A2, which removes the fatty acid at the C2 position of glycerol. Lecithins may also be modified by a process called fractionation. During this process, lecithin is mixed with an alcohol, usually ethanol. Some phospholipids, such as phosphatidylcholine, have good solubility in ethanol, whereas most other phospholipids do not dissolve well in ethanol. The ethanol is separated from the lecithin sludge, after which the ethanol is removed by evaporation to obtain a phosphatidylcholine-enriched lecithin fraction.

Genetically modified crops as a source of lecithin
As described above, lecithin is highly processed. Therefore, genetically modified (GM) protein or DNA from the original GM crop from which it is derived often is undetectable – in other words, it is not substantially different from lecithin derived from non-GM crops. Nonetheless, consumer concerns about genetically modified food have extended to highly purified derivatives from GM food, such as lecithin. This concern led to policy and regulatory changes in the EU in 2000, when Commission Regulation (EC) 50/2000 was passed which required labelling of food containing additives derived from GMOs, including lecithin. Because it is nearly impossible to detect the origin of derivatives such as lecithin, the European regulations require those who wish to sell lecithin in Europe to use a meticulous, but essential system of identity preservation (IP).

Properties and applications

Lecithins have emulsification and lubricant properties, and are a surfactant. They can be completely metabolized (see inositol) by humans, so are well tolerated by humans and nontoxic when ingested.

However, recent research contradicts previous assertions regarding the effects of emulsifiers on humans, in particular the human gut.  Research reported from 2017 to 2021 indicates that 'dietary emulsifiers can severely impact the gut microbiota, and this seems to be proportional to their emulsifying strength'.

The major components of commercial soybean-derived lecithin are:
 33–35% soybean oil
 20–21% phosphatidylinositols
 19–21% phosphatidylcholine
 8–20% phosphatidylethanolamine
 5–11% other phosphatides
 5% free carbohydrates
 2–5% sterols
 1% moisture

Lecithin is used for applications in human food, animal feed, pharmaceuticals, paints, and other industrial applications.

Applications include:
 In the pharmaceutical industry, it acts as a wetting agent, stabilizing agent and a choline enrichment carrier, helps in emulsification and encapsulation, and is a good dispersing agent. It can be used in manufacture of intravenous fat infusions and for therapeutic use.
 In animal feed, it enriches fat and protein and improves pelletization.
 In the paint industry, it forms protective coatings for surfaces with painting and printing ink, helps as a rust inhibitor, is a colour intensifying agent, catalyst, conditioning aid modifier, and dispersing aid; it is a good stabilizing and suspending agent, emulsifier, and wetting agent, helps in maintaining uniform mixture of several pigments, helps in grinding of metal oxide pigments, is a spreading and mixing aid, prevents hard settling of pigments, eliminates foam in water-based paints, and helps in fast dispersion of latex-based paints.
 Lecithin also may be used as a release agent for plastics, an anti-sludge additive in motor lubricants, an anti-gumming agent in gasoline, and an emulsifier, spreading agent, and antioxidant in textile, rubber, and other industries.

Food additive
The nontoxicity of lecithin leads to its use with food, as an additive or in food preparation (but see reference above to recent research regarding the negative effects of emulsifiers on the human gut). It is used commercially in foods requiring a natural emulsifier or lubricant.

In confectionery, it reduces viscosity, replaces more expensive ingredients, controls sugar crystallization and the flow properties of chocolate, helps in the homogeneous mixing of ingredients, improves shelf life for some products, and can be used as a coating. In emulsions and fat spreads, such as margarines with a high fat content of more than 75%, it stabilizes emulsions, reduces spattering (splashing and scattering of oil droplets) during frying, improves texture of spreads and flavor release. In doughs and baking, it reduces fat and egg requirements, helps even out distribution of ingredients in dough, stabilizes fermentation, increases volume, protects yeast cells in dough when frozen, and acts as a releasing agent to prevent sticking and simplify cleaning. It improves wetting properties of hydrophilic powders (such as low-fat proteins) and lipophilic powders (such as cocoa powder), controls dust, and helps complete dispersion in water. Lecithin keeps cocoa and cocoa butter in a candy bar from separating. It can be used as a component of cooking sprays to prevent sticking and as a releasing agent.

Lecithin is approved by the United States Food and Drug Administration for human consumption with the status "generally recognized as safe". Lecithin is admitted by the EU as a food additive, designated as E322.

Dietary supplement
Because it contains phosphatidylcholines, lecithin is a source of choline, an essential nutrient. There is no clinical evidence on the safety or efficacy of high doses of lecithin to improve milk flow in breast-feeding mothers or infants. Soy lecithin does not contain enough allergenic proteins for most people allergic to soy, although the US FDA only exempts a few soy lecithin products from its mandatory requirements for allergenic source labeling.

A 2003 review of randomized trials found no benefit of lecithin in people with dementia.

Religious restrictions
Soy-derived lecithin is considered by some to be kitniyot and prohibited on Passover for Ashkenazi Jews when many grain-based foods are forbidden, but not at other times. This does not necessarily affect Sephardi Jews, who do not have the same restrictions on rice and kitniyot during Passover.

Muslims are not forbidden to eat lecithin per se; however, since it may be derived from animal as well as plant sources, care must be taken to ensure this source is halal. Lecithin derived from plants and egg yolks is permissible, as is that derived from animals slaughtered according to the rules of dhabihah.

See also
Phytosome

References

External links 
Introduction to Lecithin (University of Erlangen)
FDA Industry guideline for soy lecithin labeling
 
 

Cholinergics
Food emulsifiers
Phospholipids
Nootropics
Soy products
Zwitterionic surfactants
E-number additives